K. K. Shailaja (born 20 November 1956) is an Indian politician and former Health Minister of Kerala who hails from Kannur district. 

Shailaja currently serves as the Member of the Legislative Assembly (MLA) representing Mattanur constituency in 15th Kerala Legislative Assembly. She is a Central Committee member of Communist Party of India (Marxist). Before entering active politics, she worked as a high school physics teacher. In June(2020), Shailaja was honoured by the United Nations for her efforts to tackle the coronavirus pandemic. She was among a few of the world leaders invited to speak on the occasion of the United Nations Public Service Day.   K. K. Shailaja was awarded the CEU Open Society Prize for 2021.

She was previously elected as the MLA of Kuthuparamba constituency twice in 1996 and 2016 and Peravoor constituency in 2006. She served as the Minister of Health, Social Justice and Woman and Child Development (Kerala) in the first Vijayan ministry (2016 – 2021). But In the 2021 Kerala Legislative Assembly election, Shailaja won the largest margin ever (over 60,000 votes) in the history of Kerala Legislative Assembly elections.

Early life

Shailaja was born on 20 November 1956 to K. Kunthan and K. K. Shantha.

Political career

K. K. Shailaja has been elected as CPI (M) Central Committee Member in the 22nd Congress of the CPI(M) held between April 18 and 22 2018 at Hyderabad, Telangana and the State Secretary of All India Democratic Women's Association.
 
She represented Kuthuparamba in 1996 and Peravoor in 2006, both of which are in Kannur district, in the Kerala Legislative Assembly. Shailaja won a total of 67,013 votes in the Kuthuparamba constituency, winning by a margin of 12,291 votes. In the first Pinarayi Vijayan ministry, she was the minister of Health and Social Welfare.

As Health Minister, Shailaja Teacher has come to be highly regarded for her unwavering commitment and strong work ethic. As quoted from one of her colleagues in the Health Department: "She is a tough taskmaster. It doesn't matter if it's midnight or if she is having any ailments, the minister is there to monitor every arrangement. In the case of nCoV prevention and control, the minister is leading from the front by convening assessment meetings daily,"

Her leadership during the Nipah and COVID-19 outbreaks was widely lauded. She had set up a team which enabled the fast diagnosis and further management of the deadly viruses. The film Virus is based on the Nipah virus outbreak in the state. In this film Revathi portrayed the character based on her.

K. K. Shailaja has received international attention for her leadership in tackling COVID-19 pandemic in Kerala. Till around mid-March, she gave daily press briefings. She was invited by the United Nations to participate in a panel discussion on United Nations Public Service Day 2020, for her efforts to fight COVID-19 in her state on June 23, 2020. The Guardian described her as "coronavirus slayer" and "rock star health minister". BBC News featured her among a list of Asian women corona fighters. She was also featured by Vogue Magazine as a "Vogue Warrior". The British magazine Prospect selected her as the world's 'top thinker' of 2020, pushing the Prime Minister of New Zealand Jacinda Ardern to the 2nd position. Financial Times named Shailaja as one of the world's most influential women of 2020.

Her exclusion in the second Vijayan ministry, which includes all debutants except chief minister, was a subject of controversy in media outlets and in social media.

Personal life
She has authored two books: Indian Varthamanavum Sthreesamoohavum and China: Rashtram, Rashtreeyam, Kazhchakal.

Electoral performance

Awards and honours
In June 2020, Shailaja was honoured by the United Nations for her efforts to tackle the coronavirus pandemic. She was among a few of the world leaders invited to speak on the occasion of the United Nations Public Service Day. K. K. Shailaja was awarded the  Central European University (CEU) Open Society Prize for 2021, the honour was in recognition of her social commitment to public health services.

References

External links 

1956 births
Living people
Communist Party of India (Marxist) politicians from Kerala
People from Kannur district
Women in Kerala politics
20th-century Indian women politicians
21st-century Indian women politicians
20th-century Indian politicians
21st-century Indian politicians